Bąków  is a village in the administrative district of Gmina Pysznica, within Stalowa Wola County, Subcarpathian Voivodeship, in south-eastern Poland.

As of 2008, the village had a population of 190.

References

Villages in Stalowa Wola County